Standings and Results for Group A of the Regular Season phase of the FIBA European Championship 1992–93 basketball tournament.

Main page: FIBA European Championship 1992–93

Tiebreakers:
Head-to-head record in matches between the tied clubs
Overall point difference in games between the tied clubs
Overall point difference in all group matches (first tiebreaker if tied clubs are not in the same group)
Points scored in all group matches
Sum of quotients of points scored and points allowed in each group match

Standings

Notes:
 Limoges win the tiebreaker over Scavolini Pesaro for second place and the home advantage in the quarterfinals. 
 Knorr Bologna win the tiebreaker over Joventut Marbella for fourth place and a playoff berth. The two teams split their group matches, but Knorr scored 2 more points head-to-head.

Fixtures and results

Game 1
October 29, 1992

Game 2
November 5, 1992

Game 3
November 26, 1992

Game 4
December 3, 1992

Game 5
December 10, 1992

Game 6
December 17, 1992

Game 7
January 6–7, 1993

Game 8
January 14, 1993

Game 9
January 20–21, 1993

Game 10
January 28, 1993

Game 11
February 4, 1993

Game 12
February 10–11, 1993

Game 13
February 17–18, 1993

Game 14
February 25, 1993

Group A
1992–93 in Greek basketball
1992–93 in Spanish basketball
1992–93 in Italian basketball
1992–93 in French basketball
1992–93 in Croatian basketball
1992–93 in Israeli basketball
1992–93 in Yugoslav basketball